State Route 186 (SR 186) is a  state highway in Macon County.

Route description
From its origination, State Route 186 passes through the Tuskegee National Forest.  The two-lane route serves as a connector route between I-85 and Phenix City and Columbus, Georgia via U.S. Highway 80.

Major intersections

References

186
186